(also stylized as OutRun) is an arcade driving video game released by Sega in September 1986. It is known for its pioneering hardware and graphics, nonlinear gameplay, a selectable soundtrack with music composed by Hiroshi Kawaguchi, and the hydraulic motion simulator deluxe arcade cabinet. The goal is to avoid traffic and reach one of five destinations.

The game was designed by Yu Suzuki, who traveled to Europe to gain inspiration for the game's stages. Suzuki had a small team and only ten months to program the game, leaving him to do most of the work himself. The game was a critical and commercial success, becoming the highest-grossing arcade game of 1987 worldwide as well as Sega's most successful arcade cabinet of the 1980s. It was ported to numerous video game consoles and home computers, becoming one of the best-selling video games at the time and selling millions of copies worldwide, and it spawned a number of sequels. Out Run is considered one of the most influential racing games, cited as an influence upon numerous later video games, playing a role in the arcade video game industry's recovery, and providing the name for a popular music genre.

Gameplay

Out Run is a 3D driving video game in which the player controls a Ferrari Testarossa Spider from a third-person rear perspective. The camera is placed near the ground, simulating a Ferrari driver's position and limiting the player's view into the distance. The road curves, crests, and dips, which increases the challenge by obscuring upcoming obstacles such as traffic that the player must avoid. The object of the game is to reach the finish line against a timer. The game world is divided into multiple stages that each end in a checkpoint, and reaching the end of a stage provides more time. Near the end of each stage, the track forks to give the player a choice of routes leading to five final destinations. The destinations represent different difficulty levels and each conclude with their own ending scene, among them the Ferrari breaking down or being presented a trophy.

Development
During the mid-1980s, Sega experienced success in the arcades with games developed by Yu Suzuki. Hang-On was a good seller and Enduro Racer had been successful enough for Sega to consider a second production run. Both are motorcycle racing games, and Out Run was Suzuki's chance to develop a car racing game. His original concept was to base the game on the American film The Cannonball Run, of which he was a fan. He disliked racing games where cars exploded on impact, and wanted gamers to enjoy the experience of driving and to feel "superior".

Suzuki initially conceived the game's setting across the United States, and he requested to scout various locations there. According to Suzuki's boss, Youji Ishii, Sega president Hayao Nakayama believed the US was too unsafe, and suggested Europe as a safer option. Additionally, Suzuki concluded that the US was too "large and empty" for the game's design. He scouted Europe for two weeks in a BMW 520 for ideas.  This tour included Frankfurt, Monaco, Rome, the Swiss Alps, the French Riviera, Florence, and Milan.  While in Monaco, Suzuki was inspired to use the Ferrari Testarossa as the playable car in the game, so when he returned to Japan he arranged for his team to find and photograph one. They took many photos of the car from every side and recorded the sound of the engine.

A small team of four programmers, a sound creator, and five graphic designers developed Out Run. Suzuki had to use only personnel that were available and not assigned to other projects at the time.  As a result, Suzuki did most of the programming and planning himself, spending extra hours at the studio to complete development of the game within ten months.  Suzuki believed that the most difficult part of developing the game was to make it as fun as possible, which he achieved by emphasizing the design elements of wide roads, buildings, and a radio with soundtrack selection.

Four cabinet designs were released, all of which are equipped with a steering wheel, a stick shift, and acceleration and brake pedals. Two of the cabinet designs are upright, the larger of which has force feedback in the steering wheel. The other two models are sit-down motion simulator cabinets that resemble the in-game car and use a drive motor to move the main cabinet—turning and shaking according to the onscreen action. Both models feature stereo speakers mounted behind the driver's head. The arcade system board made specifically for the game is the Sega OutRun, based on the Sega System 16. Suzuki stated that he was often unable to make games based on existing hardware and that Sega would have to create a new board. He said that his "designs were always 3D from the beginning. All the calculations in the system were 3D, even from Hang-On. I calculated the position, scale, and zoom rate in 3D and converted it backwards to 2D. So I was always thinking in 3D". The game achieves its 3D effects using a sprite-scaling technique called Super Scaler technology, as used one year earlier in Hang-On. Released in September 1986, Out Runs fast sprite-scaling and 3D motion provide a smoother experience than other contemporary arcade games.

Suzuki also set about simulating car features that were previously lacking in earlier driving games, so that being a skillful driver in real life would translate to being skillful in the game. They simulated features such as horsepower, torque, gear ratios and tire engineering close to real cars. They also added AI assistance for features that were difficult to control, such as drifting. For the drifting, they added details such as, if the car's tires grip the road surface too closely, the car's handling becomes too twitchy, something that wasn't appreciated in earlier driving games.

Out Runs original score was composed by Hiroshi Kawaguchi, who had previously composed soundtracks for other games designed by Suzuki, including Hang-On. The soundtrack is similar in style to Latin and Caribbean music. Three selectable tracks are featured: Passing Breeze, Splash Wave, and Magical Sound Shower. An additional track, Last Wave, plays at the final score screen. Some of the game's audio samples were corrupted due to one of the master ROM chips failing, and the glitch was not noticed until Sega was preparing a soundtrack box-set for the game's 20th anniversary. The correct files were recovered from an 8-inch floppy disk, and subsequent re-releases of the game use the fixed data. Cassette tapes of the arcade soundtrack were distributed in the United Kingdom during December 1987, both with the home computer conversions and with Computer and Video Games magazine.

Reception

Commercial performance
In Japan, Out Run topped the Game Machine charts for upright/cockpit arcade cabinets in November 1986, and remained at the top of the charts in December 1986. It was Japan's highest-grossing upright/cockpit arcade game during the latter half of 1986, and the overall seventh highest-grossing upright/cockpit arcade game of 1986. Out Run went on to become Japan's highest-grossing arcade game of 1987. In North America, it topped the RePlay dedicated arcade game chart in February 1987, and went on to become the highest-grossing arcade game of 1987 in the United States. In the United Kingdom, the game topped London's Electrocoin arcade charts for several months in 1987, from February through June, and was the top arcade game of the year. In Japan, it continued to rank among the annual highest-grossing dedicated arcade games for the next several years, ranking number three in 1988, number five in 1989, and number seven in 1990. In Europe, Out Run was the most popular arcade game during the late 1980s.

Sega had sold 18,000 Out Run arcade machines worldwide by early 1987, including 3,500 units in Japan, 8,000 units in the United States, and 6,500 units in Europe and Southeast Asia. By 1994, 30,000 cabinets had been sold worldwide. Sega eventually surpassed OutRuns arcade sales with Virtua Fighter (1993) and Virtua Fighter 2 (1994).

The 8-bit computer game ports published by U.S. Gold sold over 200,000 copies within two weeks of release in the United Kingdom, and more than 250,000 by Christmas 1987, topping the UK's Christmas 1987 chart. Out Run became the fastest-selling and best-selling computer game in the UK that year. By early March 1988, it had sold over 350,000 copies, becoming the UK's all-time fastest-selling game up until then. In May 1988, the Atari ST version of Out Run became the first ST title to top the UK all-formats chart. The Atari ST version had sold over 25,000 copies in the UK by mid-1988.

Out Run remained on the UK charts for several years. The budget price re-release from Kixx topped the all-formats chart in November 1990, and the Commodore 64 version was at number two on the all-formats chart in March 1991. It also topped the PC Engine charts during JanuaryFebruary 1991. In 2020, it was revealed that Out Run is the second best-selling Sega Ages title in overseas markets outside of Japan (after Sonic the Hedgehog), especially in Europe. , the game's various home conversions have sold millions of copies worldwide.

Critical response and accolades
Out Runs arcade release received positive reviews and became one of the most popular arcade games of the year. The game won the 1987 Golden Joystick Award for Game of the Year, as well as for Arcade Game of the Year. It also won "Best Visual Enhancement in a Video Game" at the 1986 Amusement Players Association's Players Choice Awards. Clare Edgeley reviewed the arcade game in both Computer and Video Games and in Sinclair User, praising the graphics and the element of danger in the gameplay as well as the hydraulic motion simulator cabinet. Top Score newsletter called it "the most enjoyable" and "realistic driving video game ever created" while praising its innovative simulator cabinet, detailed visuals and stereo soundtrack. A review in Commodore User described it as "a great game for driving enthusiasts" and awarded it a score of 9 out of 10. Gary Penn, writing for Crash called the game "highly polished" and praised the attention to detail.  In Your Sinclair, Peter Shaw praised its realism and described it as "the most frighteningly fast road race game I've ever played".

Out Run was ported to numerous home consoles and computers. Computer and Video Games praised the Master System release, with the writers concluding that it had "all the thrill power of the arcade version". The Games Machine gave the Master System version a score of 72%, stating that the Master System version came closest to the original coin-op. Reviewers for Dragon described it as a "refreshing" game "that provides hours of entertainment". Computer Gaming World named it as the year's best arcade translation for Sega. Reactions to the 16-bit versions were generally positive. The Atari ST version (1988) was described by Computer and Video Games as "far from perfect", but that it came closer to the arcade original than the other ports. The 1991 Sega Genesis version also received positive reviews, scoring 90% from French gaming magazines Joypad and Joystick, as well as an 85% from Swedish magazine Svenska Hemdatornytt.

The reception for the 8-bit personal computer ports by U.S. Gold was mixed. The ZX Spectrum version received positive scores from Your Sinclair and Sinclair User.  Some reviewers at Crash expressed disappointment at the low quality in contrast to the arcade original. The Games Machine gave the Spectrum version a score of 61%, noting the machine's technical limitations in comparison to the Master System and Commodore systems. The Commodore versions received positive to average reviews, though Computer and Video Games described the Commodore 64 port as "rushed". The Amstrad CPC port received a score of 8 out of 40 from Computer and Video Games, which described it as a "travesty", and a 37% score from Amstrad Action where the reviewer considered it one of the worst arcade conversions ever.

Legacy
Out Run was followed by various sequels, including three arcade sequels Turbo Out Run (1989), OutRunners (1992) and Out Run 2 (2003), and several non-arcade sequels including Out Run 3-D (1988) and Out Run Europa (1991). Rad Mobile (1991) is similar to Out Run. A conversion of Out Run was under development by Hertz for the Sharp X68000 but according to former Hertz employee Tsunetomo Sugawara, it was never released due to company management cancelling its development. A 32X version was also reportedly under development by Sega, but was never released. Ports of the arcade game were released for Nintendo 3DS on March 12, 2015 and Nintendo Switch on January 9, 2019.

Former Sega arcade director Akira Nagai has credited Out Run and similar games, for Sega's arcade success in the 1980s. According to Nagai, "Out Run, in particular, was really amazing for its time... Suzuki went on to make After Burner and a number of other games, but Out Run is still talked about with a special kind of wonder. With the taikan games, Sega's arcade business, which had been Sega's lowest performer in sales, gradually started to rise... For me personally, Hang-On and Out Run are my most memorable titles. They helped lift the arcade industry out of its slump, and created entirely new genres". The game's title has been adopted as a name for the synthwave music genre, which is also known as "outrun" music, inspired by the game's soundtrack which is selectable in-game as well as the game's 1980s aesthetic. French musician Kavinsky named his debut album OutRun (2013) after the game.

The game has been listed among the best games of all time by Next Generation, Retro Gamer, Stuff, Time, G4, Killer List Of Videogames, Yahoo!, and NowGamer. In 2017, GamesRadar+ ranked the game 31st on their "Best Sega Genesis/Mega Drive games of all time". Writing in 1001 Video Games You Must Play Before You Die, Joao Diniz Sanches praised Out Runs "unforgettable design and expertly tuned game balance", describing the game as "the consummate exhibit in an oversubscribed genre" and "one of the purest and most joyous experiences in video gaming". In 2015, Out Run appeared at 4th place on IGN's list of The Top 10 Most Influential Racing Games Ever, behind Pole Position, Gran Turismo and Virtua Racing. According to Luke Reilly, "traces of Out Run DNA can be found in series like Test Drive, Need for Speed, Project Gotham Racing and Burnout" as well as "modern racers like the Forza Horizon games and DriveClub". According to Jacopo Prisco of Wired UK, the influence of Out Run "is still being felt on consoles, in music, and in movies". Along with its influence on a wide range of racing games from Need for Speed and Gran Turismo to Project Gotham Racing and Forza Horizon, the game's selectable radio music has become commonplace in video games such as Grand Theft Auto series as well as the choice to drive through alternate paths in racing games.

Notes

References

External links

 
1986 video games
Amiga games
Amstrad CPC games
Arcade video games
Atari ST games
Cancelled Sega 32X games
Cancelled X68000 games
Commodore 64 games
DOS games
Game Boy Advance games
Golden Joystick Award winners
Golden Joystick Award for Game of the Year winners
Master System games
Mobile games
MSX games
MSX2 games
NEC PC-8801 games
Nintendo 3DS eShop games
Rutubo Games games
Sanritsu Denki games
Sega arcade games
Sega Games franchises
Game Gear games
Sega Genesis games
Sega Saturn games
Sega video games
SIMS Co., Ltd. games
Tiger Electronics handheld games
TurboGrafx-16 games
U.S. Gold games
Video games designed by Yu Suzuki
Video games scored by David Whittaker
Video games scored by Hiroshi Kawaguchi
Video games with alternate endings
Video games with stereoscopic 3D graphics
ZX Spectrum games
Nintendo Switch games
Single-player video games
Video games developed in Japan